Lázaro Navarro-Batles (born 28 January 1974) is a Cuban-Mexican former professional tennis player.

Biography
Navarro grew up in Cuba and didn't take up the sport tennis of until age 13. He played Davis Cup for his native country from 1995 to 2003, appearing in a total of 19 ties. A three-time medalist at the 1998 Central American and Caribbean Games in Maracaibo, he went on to represent Cuba at both the 1999 and 2003 editions of the Pan American Games.

Since 1999 he has been based in Mexico, after coming to the Central American country from Cuba on a sports exchange program. Married to a local from Jalisco, Navarro became a naturalized Mexican and represented his adoptive country in his final years on tour.

While competing on the professional tour he had a career high singles ranking of 327 in the world. His best performance on the ATP Challenger Tour was a run to the semi-finals at Guadalajara in 2001, with wins over Fernando González, Adrián García and Luis Morejón. He won six singles and seven doubles titles on the ITF Men's Circuit.

ITF Futures finals

Singles: 9 (6–3)

Doubles: 14 (7–7)

References

External links
 
 
 

1974 births
Living people
Cuban male tennis players
Mexican male tennis players
Central American and Caribbean Games medalists in tennis
Central American and Caribbean Games gold medalists for Cuba
Central American and Caribbean Games bronze medalists for Cuba
Competitors at the 1998 Central American and Caribbean Games
Pan American Games competitors for Cuba
Tennis players at the 1999 Pan American Games
Tennis players at the 2003 Pan American Games
Cuban emigrants to Mexico